The 14th Arkansas Infantry Regiment was the designation of two units of the Confederate Army during the American Civil War. They were :

 14th Arkansas Infantry Regiment (Powers'), formed in July 1861 as Mitchell's Regt. Became Powers' Regt in May 1862, finished at Port Hudson July 1863
 14th Arkansas Infantry Regiment (McCarver's), formed October 1861, and was consolidated in May 1862 into the 21st AIR

Military units and formations disambiguation pages